Aspidocarya is a genus of flowering plants belonging to the family Menispermaceae.

Its native range is Eastern Himalaya to Southern Central China.

Species:

Aspidocarya uvifera

References

Menispermaceae
Menispermaceae genera